Paper Route is the fourth solo studio album by American rapper Mack 10. It was released on September 5, 2000 through Hoo-Bangin'/Priority Records. Production was handled by Rashad Coes, Beatballers, Caviar, Easy Mo Bee, Leslie Brathwaite, Mark Twayne, Overdose, Rick Rock, Timbaland and Young Tre. It features guest appearances from Techniec, Big Gipp, Caviar, Jazze Pha, Kokane, Pinky, Skoop Delania, T-Boz, Too $hort, Xzibit, YoungBloodZ, and Westside Connection. The album debuted at number nineteen on the U.S. Billboard 200 chart, with 47,000 copies in its first-week of sales.

Track listing

Charts

References

External links

2000 albums
Mack 10 albums
Priority Records albums
Albums produced by Rick Rock
Albums produced by Timbaland
Albums produced by Easy Mo Bee